Viriplaca, in Roman mythology, was "the goddess who soothes the anger of man," and was applied as a surname of Juno, describing her as the bringer of peace among married couples. She had a sacellum on the Palatine, into which women went when they thought themselves wronged by their husbands. They told the goddess about their grief, after which they would be relieved of their trouble.

She was popular during the reign of Tiberius, but her popularity declined by the time of Valerius Maximus.

Her name is a reference to the Latin phrase a placandis viris (from placating husbands).

References

Roman goddesses